Harry Gilbert Gleason (March 28, 1875 – October 21, 1961) was a utility infielder/outfielder in Major League Baseball who played from 1901 through 1905 for the Boston Americans (1901–03) and St. Louis Browns (1904–05). Listed at 5' 6", 160 lb., Gleason batted and threw right-handed. He was born in Camden, New Jersey. His older brother, Kid Gleason, also was a major league player.

A line-drive hitter, Gleason delivered a pinch-hit single and stole a base in his first major league at-bat with the Boston Americans. After that, he made 262 fielding appearances as a third baseman (202), shortstop (20) and second baseman (16), as well at center field (16) and left (8). His most productive season came with the 1905 St. Louis Browns, when he played a career-high 150 games including 144 as the team's regular third base, while hitting 17 extrabases with 45 runs and 57 RBI, also career-numbers.

In a five-season career, Gleason was a .218 hitter (206-for-944) with three home runs and 90 RBI in 274 games, including 88 runs, 24 doubles, 11 triples, and 31 stolen bases.

Gleason died at his hometown of Camden, New Jersey at age 86.

External links

1875 births
1961 deaths
Boston Americans players
St. Louis Browns players
Major League Baseball infielders
Major League Baseball outfielders
Baseball players from Camden, New Jersey
Springfield Ponies players
Springfield Maroons players
Meriden Silverites players
Utica Pentups players
Columbus Senators players
Williamsport Millionaires players
Jersey City Skeeters players
Trenton Tigers players
Wilmington Peaches players
Harrisburg Senators players
York White Roses players
Binghamton Bingoes players
Utica Utes players